Hiram Seymour Hall (September 26, 1835 - July 1, 1908) was a Union Army officer in the American Civil War who received the U.S. military's highest decoration, the Medal of Honor

Hall was born in Barkersville, New York on September 26, 1835. He was awarded the Medal of Honor, for extraordinary heroism shown on June 27, 1862 at the Battle of Gaines's Mill and on November 7, 1863 at the Second Battle of Rappahannock Station, while serving as a Captain with Company G, 121st New York Infantry.

After the war, he returned to New York and married Augusta J. Galentine Hall (1842–1927). The couple had three children: Clarence Seymour Hall (1868–1922), Harry B. Hall (1869–1891), and Augusta J. Hall Kemper (1880–1940). His Medal of Honor was issued on August 17, 1891. Hall died at the age of 72, on July 1, 1908 survived by his wife and two of his children and was buried at Oak Hill Cemetery in Lawrence, Kansas.

Medal of Honor citation

Notes

References

External links
 121st Infantry Regiment – Civil War – Otsego And Herkimer Regiment

1835 births
1908 deaths
People from Saratoga County, New York
Burials in Kansas
People of New York (state) in the American Civil War
Union Army officers
United States Army Medal of Honor recipients
American Civil War recipients of the Medal of Honor